Guram Kashia (born 4 July 1987) is a Georgian professional footballer who plays as a centre-back for Slovan Bratislava and captains the Georgian national team.

Developed at Dinamo Tbilisi, he spent most of his career at Dutch Eredivisie club Vitesse, where he was captain. In eight years in the Netherlands, he played 292 official matches (24 goals) and won the KNVB Cup in 2017.

Club career

Dinamo Tbilisi
Kashia started playing for Dinamo Tbilisi. He is still a big fan of his former club.

Vitesse
In 2010, Kashia moved to the Netherlands and signed for Vitesse. Kashia soon became a regular member of the starting line-up of the club and two seasons after joining, Kashia was elected as the captain of the club. During his career at Vitesse, he amassed a total of 292 matches.

In August 2015, Kashia was named Best Player of August in Eredivisie.

Kashia led Vitesse to the domestic KNVB Cup in 2016–17, starting all but one of their six games and recording a goal and an assist. In his five starts, the club outscored their opponents 12–2, including a 2–0 victory over eventual league champions Feyenoord Rotterdam in the quarterfinals.

In October 2017, Kashia wore a rainbow-striped captain's armband for Vitesse against Heracles Almelo in support of LGBT rights, leading to a backlash in his own country and calls for him to step down from the Georgian national team.

His name was also transliterated as Goeram Kasjia in Dutch.

San Jose Earthquakes
On 14 June 2018, Kashia joined Major League Soccer side San Jose Earthquakes on a multi-year contract, joining compatriot and close friend Vako Qazaishvili.

San Jose declined their contract option on Kashia following their 2020 season.

International career

Kashia made his Georgia debut on 1 April 2009 against Montenegro. In October 2012, he scored Georgia's only goal against Finland in a 2014 World Cup qualifier.

Kashia was named Georgian Footballer of the Year twice, in 2012 and in 2013. , Kashia captains his country. On 26 September 2022, he played his 100th match for Georgia in the Nations League game against Gibraltar.

Personal life
Kashia is from Tbilisi, Georgia. He married his wife Tamtuka in 2009, and their daughter Alessandra was born in 2013. His older brother Shota is also a professional footballer and has played at Georgian Erovnuli Liga club FC Chikhura Sachkhere since 2013; both brothers wear #37 for their clubs. Kashia has stated that his older brother is the reason he began playing football as a child.

In November 2017, while playing for Vitesse, Kashia wore a rainbow armband as part of the Dutch initiative Coming Out Day. His show of support for gay rights led to protests outside the Georgian Football Federation's headquarters demanding his removal from the national team, at which eight people were arrested. He described himself as being "proud to support equal rights". In August 2018, he became the inaugural recipient of UEFA's #EqualGame award for his pro-LGBT rights stand. He was unable to attend the awards ceremony in Monaco due to his club commitments with San Jose, but submitted a video acceptance speech in which he said, "I believe in equality for everyone, no matter what you believe in, who you love or who you are...I will always keep defending equality and equal rights for everyone, wherever I will play." In December 2018, he received the Presidential Order of Excellence from Georgian president Giorgi Margvelashvili.

He is outspoken about the ongoing illegal Russian occupation of Georgia following the 2008 Russo-Georgian War.

Kashia obtained his U.S. green card in July 2019, qualifying him as a domestic player for MLS roster purposes.

Career statistics

Club

International
Scores and results list Georgia's goal tally first, score column indicates score after each Kashia goal.

Honours
Dinamo Tbilisi
Georgian League: 2007–08
Georgian Cup: 2008–09
Georgian Super Cup: 2008

Vitesse
KNVB Cup: 2016–17

Slovan Bratislava
Fortuna Liga: 2021–22

Individual
Presidential order of excellence for unconditional support of LGBTQ+ community: 2018 
UEFA#EqualGame Award: 2018
Georgian Footballer of the Year: 2012, 2013
 Vitesse player of the Year: 2015–16

References

External links

  Player profile at Dinamo's official website 

 Voetbal International profile 
 

1987 births
Living people
Footballers from Tbilisi
Footballers from Georgia (country)
Georgia (country) under-21 international footballers
Georgia (country) international footballers
Expatriate footballers from Georgia (country)
Association football defenders
FC Dinamo Tbilisi players
SBV Vitesse players
San Jose Earthquakes players
FC Locomotive Tbilisi players
ŠK Slovan Bratislava players
Erovnuli Liga players
Eredivisie players
Major League Soccer players
Slovak Super Liga players
Expatriate footballers in the Netherlands
Expatriate soccer players in the United States
Expatriate footballers in Slovakia
Expatriate sportspeople from Georgia (country) in the Netherlands
Expatriate sportspeople from Georgia (country) in the United States
Expatriate sportspeople from Georgia (country) in Slovakia
FIFA Century Club